Ivan Janek (born 1 July 1986) is a Slovak football defender who currently plays for the Majstrovstvá regiónu club MFK Zemplín Michalovce B. 

Janek began his playing career with ŠK Slovan Bratislava. He also had a spell with Bohemians 1905, making nine appearances in the Czech Gambrinus liga.

References

1986 births
Living people
Slovak footballers
Association football defenders
ŠK Slovan Bratislava players
Czech First League players
Bohemians 1905 players
FK Viktoria Žižkov players
Expatriate footballers in the Czech Republic
MFK Zemplín Michalovce players
Slovak Super Liga players